Bazillion Points is a book publishing company owned and operated by author Ian Christe. It was founded in 2007 and is headquartered in Brooklyn, New York.

Books
 Swedish Death Metal, by Daniel Ekeroth Released July 29, 2008.
 Once upon a Nightwish: The Official Biography 1996–2006, by Mape Ollila Released December 29, 2008.
 Sheriff McCoy: Outlaw Legend of Hanoi Rocks, by Andy McCoy Released September 22, 2009.
 Hellbent for Cooking: The Heavy Metal Cookbook, by Annick Giroux Released December 1, 2009.
 Only Death Is Real: An Illustrated History of Hellhammer and Early Celtic Frost, by Tom Gabriel Fischer (AKA Tom G Warrior) and Martin Eric Ain Released March 30, 2010.
 Touch and Go: The Complete Hardcore Punk Zine '79-'83", by Tesco Vee and Dave Stimson Released June 30, 2010.
 Mean Deviation: Four Decades of Progressive Heavy Metal, by Jeff Wagner Released December 1, 2010.
 Swedish Sensationsfilms: A Clandestine History of Sex, Thrillers, and Kicker Cinema, by Daniel Ekeroth Released April 1, 2011.
 Metalion: The Slayer Mag Diaries, by Jon Kristiansen Released July 19, 2011
 Dirty Deeds: My Life Inside/Outside of AC/DC, by Mark Evans Released December 13, 2011.
 Murder in the Front Row: Shots From the Bay Area Thrash Metal Epicenter, by Harald Oimoen and Brian Lew Released January 24, 2012.
 We Got Power!: Hardcore Punk Scenes from 1980s Southern California, by David Markey and Jordan Schwartz, including essays by Jennifer Schwartz, Henry Rollins, Keith Morris, Chuck Dukowski, Dez Cadena, Louiche Mayorga, Cameron Jamie, Pat Fear, Steve Humann, Tony Adolescent, Jack Brewer, Jula Bell, Mike Watt, Sean Wheeler, Joe Carducci, Daniel "Shredder" Weizmann, and Janet Housden. Released October 30, 2012.
 What Are You Doing Here?: A Black Woman's Life and Liberation in Heavy Metal, by Laina Dawes Released January 8, 2013.
 Experiencing Nirvana: Grunge in Europe, 1989, by Bruce Pavitt Released December 24, 2014.
 Heavy Metal Movies: Guitar Barbarians, Mutant Bimbos & Cult Zombies Amok in the 666 Most Ear- and Eye-Ripping Big-Scream Films Ever!, by Mike "McBeardo" McPadden. Released June 24, 2014.
 SLAYER MAG X, by Jon Kristiansen. Hardcover reissue release of the tenth issue of Norway's Slayer Mag fanzine (1994). Released May, 2014.
 SUB POP U.S.A.: The Subterraneanan Pop Music Anthology, 1980–1988, by Bruce Pavitt. Released December 9, 2014.
 NYHC: New York Hardcore, 1980–1990, by Tony Rettman. Released December 30, 2014.
City Baby: Surviving in Leather, Bristles, Studs, Punk Rock, and G.B.H, by Ross Lomas. Released November 24, 2015
Choosing Death: The Improbable History of Death Metal & Grindcore, by Albert Mudrian. Released November 22, 2016
Misery Obscura: The Photography of Eerie Von (1981-2009), by Eerie Von. Released November 29, 2016
Straight Edge: A Clear-Headed Hardcore Punk History, by Tony Rettman. Released November 14, 2017
Teen Movie Hell: A Crucible of Coming-of-Age Comedies from Animal House to Zapped!, by Mike "McBeardo" McPadden. Released April 16, 2019
TEXAS IS THE REASON: The Mavericks of Lone Star Punk, by Pat Blashill. Released February 14, 2020
I'm Not Holding Your Coat: My Bruises-and-All Memoir of Punk Rock Rebellion, by Nancy Barile. 
Mellodrama, the Mellotron Story: How Harry Chamberlin's Magic Box Set Loose the Beatles, Prog Rock, Post-Punk, and 'Free Bird, by Dianna Dilworth . Forthcoming

DVDs
 Mellodrama: The Mellotron Movie, by Dianna Dilworth (UPC 705105476964) Released January 19, 2010

References

External links
 Official site
 A Time Out New York interview with Ian Christe

Book publishing companies based in New York (state)
Publishing companies established in 2007
American companies established in 2007